is a Japanese professional footballer who plays as a forward or a winger for  club Kawasaki Frontale.

Career statistics

Honours
J1 League: 2020

References

External links

2000 births
Living people
Japanese footballers
Japan youth international footballers
Association football forwards
Kawasaki Frontale players
Renofa Yamaguchi FC players
Tokushima Vortis players
Sagan Tosu players
J1 League players
J2 League players
Japan under-20 international footballers